Moturekareka Island is a small island off the southern edge of Kawau Island in Auckland's Hauraki Gulf, approximately 43.7 km north of Auckland. It is separated from nearby Motuketekete Island by Blanche Channel.

A full-rigged four-masted steel ship constructed in the English seaport of Whitehaven in Cumbria, and launched as the "Alice A.Leigh" in 1889, later changed into a four-masted barque and renamed the Rewa, now forms an artificial breakwater on the northeastern side of the island. She was sunk intentionally by the island's owner Charles Hanson in 1930. The masts can still be seen laying in the water at the bow of the Rewa.  When the Rewa was sunk the top deck was cut off her as the tide came in which is why she is cut on an angle.

References 

Islands of the Auckland Region
Uninhabited islands of New Zealand